Sally Mae Pettway Mixon (born 1965) is an American artist. She is associated with the Gee's Bend quilting collective, alongside her mother, Candis Pettway, and her sisters Qunnie Pettway and Edwina Pettway.

Her work Blocks and Strips (2003) is in the permanent collection of the National Gallery of Art, where it was featured in the exhibition Called to Create: Black Artists of the American South (September 18, 2022 - March 26, 2023, curated by Harry Cooper). Her work was also featured in the Assembly: New Acquisitions by Contemporary Black Artists exhibit at The Blanton Museum of Art (December 11, 2021 - September 4, 2022).

References 

Living people
1965 births
21st-century American women artists
American quilters
21st-century American artists
African-American women artists
21st-century African-American women
21st-century African-American artists
20th-century African-American people
20th-century African-American women